Igor Vsevolodovich Grekhov (born 10 September 1934 in Smolensk) is a Soviet and Russian physicist and electrical engineer, full member of the Russian Academy of Sciences. He is known as one of the founders of the power semiconductor device industry in the Soviet Union. His contributions to the field of pulsed power devices and converter technique were recognized by the awarding of the Lenin Prize, the two State Prizes and several State orders of Russia. He headed the laboratory at the Ioffe Physical Technical Institute in St. Petersburg over several decades.

Professional career 
Grekhov was born to a family of schoolteachers in Smolensk, but his childhood passed in the city of Simferopol, Crimea.

After finishing secondary school, Grekhov studied electrical engineering at the Bauman Moscow State Technical University. Then he spent several years (1958—1962) in industry, working as a research engineer and head of the laboratory at the “Electrovipryamitel” factory in Saransk (Mordovia, USSR).

In 1962, Grekhov joined the Ioffe Institute in Leningrad and has since been an employee of the Institute for more than half-century, sequentially occupying the positions of a junior, ordinary and senior scientist, a group head and a research-sector head. In 1967 and 1975, he earned, respectively, the Ph.D. and Doktor nauk degrees, both in the physics of semiconductors. In 1982—2019, Grekhov headed the Power electronics laboratory. In the period from 2004 to 2014, he also served as a head of the Solid-State Electronics Department of the Institute. Along with his research activity, he taught a course in Semiconductor devices as a professor of St. Petersburg Polytechnic University (1984—1994).

In 1991 Grekhov was elected to corresponding membership in the Academy of Sciences of the USSR and in 2008 up-ranked to full member in the Russian Academy of Sciences.

Major achievements 
Grekhov’s research work always concentrated on the physics of solid-state devices, with a special point related to their application in power electronics. His interests cover all the steps from background theoretical studies through a trial sample fabrication up to coordination of mass production of power devices including converters. His pioneering contributions in 1960s and 1970s provided a technological breakthrough for the semiconductor industry and gave birth to its new branch – power semiconductor device engineering – in the Soviet Union.

The most important results are:  
 Observation of an effect of a uniform switching of a silicon-based thyristor structure under excitation with YAG:Nd laser pulses, creation of the fast high-power switches (10 kV, 30 kA, 20 ns pulse rise time) relying on this effect; 
 Discovery of impact ionization fronts in high-voltage pn-junctions triggered by a steep voltage pulse; this phenomenon is used in the superfast switches, such as avalanche diode sharpeners or fast-ionization dynistors, with the pulse-rise time shorter than 100 ps;
 Inventions (1982—1983) of the new-type opening switch called the Drift Step Recovery Diode (DSRD) capable of operating in the pulse power range from units to hundreds megawatts, and of a Reversely Switch-on Dynistor (RSD) enabling commutation of the MegaAmpere-range currents within tens of microseconds. The most power semiconductor switch employing RSDs is now in use at the Russian Federal Nuclear Center;
 Prediction of a new physical effect of a tunneling-assisted formation of the ionization front in silicon devices. This front was shown to be responsible for an extremely fast (~20 ps) device switching; 
 Technical idea of a new device, competitive with IGBT, – the integrated thyristor with the external field-effect control. This device exhibits similar characteristics to those of IGBT but does not require such refined technological facilities to produce;
 Creation of the silicon carbide (SiC) devices for power electronics, particularly of the SiC-based opening switches.

The research in Grekhov’s laboratory includes also some other problems of the semiconductor device physics: tunneling phenomena in MIS-structures, ferroelectric memories, porous silicon and superconductive ceramics.

Awards

Representative publications 
 I. V. Grekhov, Pulse power generation in nano- and subnano- second range by means of ionizing fronts in semiconductors: the state of the art and future prospects, IEEE Transactions on Plasma Science, 38:5 (2010), 1118–1123.
 I. V. Grekhov, Power Semiconductor Electronics and Pulse Technology, Herald of the Russian Academy of Sciences, 78:1 (2008), 22–30.
 I. V. Grekhov, G. A. Mesyats, Nanosecond semiconductor diodes for pulsed power switching, Physics-Uspekhi, 48:7 (2005), 703–712.
 P. Rodin, U. Ebert, W. Hundsdorfer, I. Grekhov, Tunneling-assisted impact ionization fronts in semiconductors, Journal of Applied Physics, 92:2 (2002), 958–964.
 I. V. Grekhov, New principles of high power switching with semiconductor devices, Solid-State Electronics, 32:11 (1989), 923–930.

Totally, Grekhov has co-authorized four books, about 200 patents and more than 600 scientific papers.

References

Living people
1934 births
Russian physicists
Russian inventors
Lenin Prize winners
Recipients of the USSR State Prize
Recipients of the Order of Honour (Russia)
State Prize of the Russian Federation laureates
Corresponding Members of the USSR Academy of Sciences
Full Members of the Russian Academy of Sciences